QLab is a cue-based, multimedia playback software package for macOS, intended for use in theatre and live entertainment. It is developed by Figure 53, an American company based in Baltimore, Maryland.

History 
QLab 1.3.10 was the first version of the software and was released on May 25, 2007. In January 2009, Version 2.0 was released with a complete visual makeover of the interface and new control features. 2013 marked the release of QLab Version 3.0, with a wide range of new features, particularly in the realm of audio and video effects, Syphon video, the addition of microphone cues, and integration of OSC capabilities. 2013 also saw the publication of the first book dedicated to the use of the software, QLab 3 Show Control: Projects for Live Performances & Installations, by Jeromy Hopgood (not affiliated with Figure 53, LLC). . In 2016, Figure 53 released the newest major version of QLab, version 4.0. As with previous versions, this one added many new user functions, including the addition of lighting cues. This new function allowed QLab to function as a lighting console. As with Version 3, a new edition of the QLab book was released called QLab 4: Projects in Video, Audio, and Lighting Control, by Jeromy Hopgood. As of February, 2023, the most recent version of QLab is 5.1.

Uses

Cues 
In QLab, a cue is a marker for an action to take place in the program. When triggered, a cue executes an operation. The list of available cues in v4 is as follows:
 Audio
 Mic
 Video
 Camera
Text
Lights (Art-Net or DMX)
 Fade
 OSC
 MIDI (voice messages, sysex, or MSC)
 MIDI File
 Timecode (MTC or LTC)
 Group
 Start
 Stop
 Pause
 Load
 Reset
 Devamp
 Goto
 Target
 Arm
 Disarm
 Wait
 Memo
 Scripts

Audio playback 
QLab allows an end-user or designer to align audio files in a sequential order. Once the audio files are inserted into the cue list, the end-user can then manipulate it by looping it, changing the amplitude or volume, and adding fades in or out. Audio cues can also be placed into groups, so that multiple files can be triggered at one moment.

Video playback 

The video capability of the software in its most recent version allows a designer to add video files to their cue lists, allowing them to be time aligned with other cues, including audio files. Video files can be altered in real time in QLab, by integrating a Quartz Composer file. The designer can also select on which video card or cards the video will play. It is useful to note that the speed of the computer processor and video card can affect the quality of video playback.

MIDI integration 
QLab supports MIDI bi-directionally. QLab allows MIDI signals to be sent as a cue to trigger other devices, such as digital audio consoles. The software also accepts MIDI signals as triggers for its own cues. MIDI signals can be sent to QLab from other computers running QLab software, or any other MIDI capable device, using a MIDI Interface.

Live playback 
A key software feature with QLab is its ease of use in live playback situations. The designer of a cue sheet can save their show file, and lock it, preventing any changes to the cues. After doing so, an untrained user can run the software in a playback situation. By default, a cue is triggered by clicking a large GO button on the screen, or by pressing the space bar.

References 

Stagecraft software
Sound production
MIDI